Mariner Books, originally an imprint of HMH Books, was established in 1997 as a publisher of fiction, non-fiction, and poetry in trade paperback. Mariner is also the publisher of the Harvest backlist, formerly published by Harcourt Brace/Harcourt Brace Jovanovich. HarperCollins bought HMH in May 2021 for US$349 million. As of fall 2021, Mariner Books was listed as an imprint of HarperCollins.

List of books published
The Hobbit by J.R.R Tolkien (1937)
The Fellowship of the Ring by J.R.R Tolkien (1954)
The Two Towers by J.R.R Tolkien (1954)
The Return of the King by J.R.R Tolkien
The Man in the High Castle, by Philip K. Dick (1962)
The Castle of Crossed Destinies, by Italo Calvino, Translated by William Weaver, 1979.
The Blue Flower, by Penelope Fitzgerald (1997)
101 Things You Don't Know About Science and No one Else Does Either by James Trefil (1997) 
Suspicious River, Laura Kasischke (1997) (adapted into a film of the same name)
Fasting, Feasting by Anita Desai (1999) 
Becoming Madame Mao, Anchee Min (2001)
The Namesake by Jhumpa Lahiri (2003) 
The Best Day the Worst Day: Life with Jane Kenyon by Donald Hall (2005) 
The Every Boy by Dana Adam Shapiro (2005) 
The Last Gentleman Adventurer: Coming of Age in the Arctic by Edward Beauclerk Maurice (2005) 
Generation Rx: How Prescription Drugs Are Altering American Lives, Minds, and Bodies by Greg Critser (2005) 
The Declaration of Independent Filmmaking: An Insider's Guide to Making Movies Outside of Hollywood, The Polish brothers and Jonathan Sheldon. (2005) 
Afterlands: A Novel by Steven Heighton (2006) 
Fun Home: A Family Tragicomic by Alison Bechdel (2006) 
My Latest Grievance by Elinor Lipman (2006) 
The Worst Hard Time: The Untold Story of Those Who Survived the Great American Dust Bowl by Timothy Egan (2006) 
 Extremely Loud & Incredibly Close by Jonathan Safran Foer (2005)
The Canon: A Whirligig Tour of the Beautiful Basics of Science by Natalie Angier (2007) 
Just a Couple of Days by Tony Vigorito (2007) 
Lately by Sara Pritchard (2007) 
Hunting Eichmann by Neal Bascomb
Ramshackle Ode by Keith Leonard (2016) 
The 2020 Commission Report on the North Korean Nuclear Attacks Against the United States by Jeffrey Lewis
Yovanovitch, Maria L. Lessons From the Edge: A Memoir. March 15, 2022. . .

References

External links
 Mariner Books Website

Book publishing companies of the United States
Publishing companies established in 1997